The 1966–67 Weber State Wildcats men's basketball team represented Weber State College during the 1966–67 NCAA University Division basketball season. Members of the Big Sky Conference, the Wildcats were led by seventh-year head coach Dick Motta and played their home games on campus at Wildcat Gym in Ogden, Utah.

This was the final season in which the Big Sky was excluded from the NCAA tournament. Weber State was the conference champion (regular season) for the next six years, with an automatic bid; the conference tournament debuted in March 1976.

References

External links
Sports Reference – Weber State Wildcats: 1966–67 basketball season
2015–16 Media Guide: 1966–67 season

Weber State Wildcats men's basketball seasons
Weber State